Rhaphicera moorei, the small tawny wall, is a species of satyrine butterfly found in western China, India (Simla and Sikkim) and Tibet.

References

Elymniini
Taxa named by Arthur Gardiner Butler
Butterflies described in 1867
Butterflies of Asia